National Secondary Route 171, or just Route 171 (or ) is a National Road Route of Costa Rica, located in the Heredia province.

Description
This road starts next to the San Vicente de Paul Hospital in Heredia, and ends in the junction with Route 106 in Ulloa.

In Heredia province the route covers Heredia canton (Heredia, San Francisco, Ulloa districts).

References

Highways in Costa Rica